The 25th Hour is a studio album released by Italian band Vision Divine. The album is a conceptual work based on their past album Stream of Consciousness.

Track listing 

All music written by Carlo Andrea Magnani (Olaf Thorsen) and Michele Luppi, except where noted. All lyrics by Thorsen.

 My Angel Died (music by Olaf Thorsen) - 0:53
 The 25th Hour - 5:34
 Out of a Distant Night (Voices) - 5:29
 Alpha & Omega - 5:49
 Eyes of a Child - 5:00
 The Daemon You Hide - 4:50
 Waiting for the Dawn (instrumental) (music by Olaf Thorsen) - 1:48
 Essence of Time - 4:43
 A Perfect Suicide (music by Cristiano Bertocchi and Michelle Luppi) - 5:21
 Heaven Calling (music by Michelle Luppi) - 3:39
 Ascension (music by Olaf Thorsen) - 2:15
 Another Day (Dream Theater cover) Bonus track for Japan only - 4:28
Total length: 49:49

Credits
 Olaf Thorsen - Guitar
 Michele Luppi - Vocal
 Cristiano Bertocchi - Bass
 Federico Puleri - Guitar
 Alessio "Tom" Lucatti - Keyboard
 Alessandro "Bix" Bissa - drums

External links
 Vision Divine official web site

2007 albums
Concept albums
Vision Divine albums
Scarlet Records albums